The 2012 NCAA Division I women's volleyball tournament started on November 29, 2012 and ended on December 15 at the KFC Yum! Center in Louisville, Kentucky with Texas winning the national championship. The NCAA selection show was televised on Sunday, November 25, 2012.

With its appearance in the Final Four, Michigan became the second unseeded team to make it that far since seeding began in 1997 (and in 2000 in its current method).

Texas won their second NCAA volleyball championship in school history, defeating first-time finalist Oregon (winner over Penn State in its semi-final) in a three-set final match sweep.

Qualifying teams
The champions of the NCAA's 31 conferences qualify automatically. Twenty-two conferences hold tournaments, while the other nine award their automatic bid on the basis of being the league's regular-season champion. Those that do not hold tournaments are the Atlantic Coast, Big 12, Big West, Big Ten, Ivy League, Mountain West, Pac-12, Southeastern and West Coast Conferences. The other 33 bids are apportioned on an at-large basis. Only the top 16 teams overall are seeded.

Records

All together, the Big Ten and Pac-12 got six at-large bids in addition to their automatic, the West Coast Conference got five, the Big 12 and the Southeastern four, the Atlantic Coast three, the Big East and Missouri Valley two, and the Mountain West received one at-large bid. The other 22 conferences only got their automatic qualifiers in.

Bracket
The first two rounds were held on campus sites (the home court of the seeded team). Regional semifinals and finals were held at pre-determined sites. In 2012, those sites were hosted by Purdue, Nebraska, Texas, and California, all of whom made the tournament. Unlike the NCAA basketball tournament, where teams cannot be placed into regionals that they host, the selectors in the volleyball tournament were required to place qualifying teams in their 'home' regionals, in order to reduce travel costs.

Purdue Regional

Nebraska Regional

Texas Regional

California Regional

Final Four

Final Four All-Tournament Team:
Bailey Webster - Texas (Most Outstanding Player)
Hannah Allison - Texas
Hayley Eckerman - Texas
Sha'Dare McNeal - Texas
Alaina Bergsma - Oregon
Liz Brenner - Oregon
Lexi Erwin - Michigan

Record by conference

* Three of the Big Ten's losses were to fellow Big Ten schools (so they are also counted as wins).

The columns R32, S16, E8, F4, CM, and NC respectively stand for the Round of 32, Sweet Sixteen, Elite Eight, Final Four, Championship Match, and National Champion.

The America East, Atlantic Sun, Big Sky, Big South, Colonial Athletic, Conference USA, Horizon League, Ivy League, Metro Atlantic, Mid-Eastern Athletic, Northeast, Ohio Valley, Patriot League, Southland, Southwestern Athletic, Summit League, and Western Athletic Conferences all qualified one team which lost in the first round.

NCAA tournament record
There is one tournament record broken in 2012 that still stands today:
Services aces, tournament (individual record) – Micha Hancock, Penn State – 22 aces (10 vs. Binghamton, 5 vs. Bowling Green, 2 vs. Kentucky,  5 vs. Minnesota.)

See also
NCAA Women's Volleyball Championship
AVCA
AIAW Women's Volleyball Championship

References

NCAA Women's Volleyball Championship
NCAA
Sports competitions in Louisville, Kentucky
NCAA Division I Women's Volleyball
NCAA Division I women's volleyball tournament
Volleyball in Kentucky
 
Women's sports in Kentucky